North Nazimabad is a suburb of, Karachi, Pakistan. North Nazimabad was developed in the late 1950s as a residential area for the employees of the federal government of Pakistan, and was named after Khawaja Nazimuddin who was the second Governor-General of Pakistan and later the second Prime Minister of Pakistan.

History
Before the independence of Pakistan, the area of the present day North Nazimabad was semi-arid land with small Sindhi and Kalmati Baloch villages nearly 15 km from downtown Karachi. The Government of Pakistan bought the land in 1950 from the local landlord and tribal leader Masti Brohi Khan in order to resettle the Muslim refugees from India that were living in tent cities in central Karachi. This suburb developed as  KDA Scheme no. 2 was named after Khawaja Nazimuddin who was the second Governor-General of Pakistan and later the second Prime Minister of Pakistan as well. In late 1958, the northern area of Nazimabad, was to be developed as KDA Scheme 2''' a.k.a. Timuria by Karachi Improvement Trust (KIT). North Nazimabad was originally established in 1958, with Karachi Improvement Trust (KIT) starting that housing scheme. The land was purchased by Pakistan Public Works Department from Sardar Masti Brohi Khan. The name North Nazimabad became popular and was later adopted instead of Timuria. Taimooria or Timuria'' was named after Amir Timur the progenitor of Mughal Empire of South Asia. North Nazimabad was developed as a residential area for federal government employees.

Urban planning 

North Nazimabad was planned and designed in the late 1950s by calramos Scarpa & Aldo Rossi, the Italian planners and architects. But in the early 1960s, the capital of Pakistan was transferred from Karachi to newly developed capital Islamabad. On account of these two factors, it is known as a well-planned outskirts of Karachi with blocks located alphabetically. North Nazimabad Town has a moderate literacy rate. and a relatively low street crime rate. With every passing day its becoming a posh suburb where previously It was considered as a upper middle class suburb of Karachi. In January 2005, Karachi city mayor Naimatullah Khan inaugurated a model park for the people of North Nazimabad.

In November 2007, it was announced by the Karachi city mayor Syed Mustafa Kamal that a gymkhana would be constructed on a 4.7 acres of land to provide recreation facilities to the middle-class people of North Nazimabad.

Demography
Muhajirs form the majority of north nazimabad's population. There are several minority ethnic groups in North Nazimabad including:Bohras, Ismailis, Kutchis, Punjabis, and Pakhtuns.

See also 
 Nazimabad
 North Nazimabad Town
 North Karachi
 Naya Nazimabad

References

External links 

Neighbourhoods of Karachi
North Nazimabad Town